Rüstəmlı (also, Rustam and Rustamly) is a village and municipality in the Sabirabad Rayon of Azerbaijan. It has a population of 651.

References 

Populated places in Sabirabad District